The 1996 NCAA Men's Division II Ice Hockey Tournament involved 2 schools playing in a best of three game series to determine the national champion of men's NCAA Division II college ice hockey.  A total of 2 games were played, hosted by Alabama-Huntville.

Alabama–Huntsville, coached by Doug Ross, won the national title over three-time defending champion Bemidji State, two games to none.

Tony Guzzo, was the tournament leading scorer with five points.

Tournament Format
One eastern and one western team were invited to play a modified best-of-three tournament. In the first two games the teams would be awarded points (2 points for a win, one point for a tie) and whichever team had the most points would be the champion. If the teams were tied after two games then a 20-minute mini-game would be played to determine the champion.

Qualifying teams

Tournament Games

Note: * denotes overtime period(s)Note: Mini-games in italics

Tournament Awards
None Awarded

External links

 
NCAA Men's Division II Ice Hockey Tournament
NCAA men's ice hockey championship
NCAA Division II men's ice hockey tournament